Horizon was a cruise ship that sailed from 1990-2020, and was the first new build for Celebrity Cruises. She was sent for scrapping in Aliaga in 2022.

Service history
However, upon the formation of Celebrity Cruises after an agreement with the government of Bermuda, it was transferred while under construction, and entered service for the new upscale brand. 

The ship was significant as it was the first new build ordered by parent company Chandris and the new Celebrity brand, both of which only had operated second hand ships prior. The exterior of the ship was designed by Jon Bannenberg while the principal designers for the interiors were Athens based Michael Katsourakis, Patricia Hayes & Associates, and British Designer John McNeece. 

The ship was christened by Myrto Chandris, the wife of company founder Dimitri Chandris, and was delivered on on April 11, 1990. The ship was built for New York to Bermuda cruises sailing in tandem with the Meridian, calling at Hamilton and St. George's during the summer, and spent the winter sailing Caribbean cruises. The Horizon was joined by an identical sister ship, the Zenith, in 1992. The Horizon would continue the Bermuda routes, and would also be Celebrity's first ship to sail Alaska cruises. 

The vessel's service with Celebrity ended after 15 years in September 2005, when it was transferred to Island Cruises a then subsidiary of Royal Caribbean. The ship underwent refits over the end of 2005 and the beginning of 2006 and was operating out of Palma de Mallorca in the Mediterranean Sea as Island Star in summer and from Caribbean in winter season of 2008. It advertised cruising as  "relaxed, friendly, and informal".

On 6 October 2008, Royal Caribbean Cruises Ltd. (RCL), the owner of Island Star, sold their 50% interest in Island Cruises to First Choice Holidays. Island Star was reported to be transferred to the fleet of RCL's Spain-based subsidiary Pullmantur Cruises, although reports in May 2009 said that the ship would go to another Royal Caribbean company, CDF Croisières de France. Pictures in May 2009 showed the ship in Pullmantur Cruises colors and renamed Pacific Dream, although the trademark “X” of Celebrity Cruises, while painted-over, could still be seen. Horizon sailed European and Caribbean itineraries.

In November 2010, it was reported that Pacific Dream would be replacing their ship . She was renamed L'Horizon in 2012.

In late 2016, it was announced that the CDF Croisières de France brand was to be discontinued, with Horizon returning to the fleet of Pullmantur Cruises.

An anonymous crew member of the Horizon reported on 28 March 2020 that a member of the crew had tested positive for COVID-19 on 26 March 2020.  With about 250 crew members and contractors aboard, the ship had docked at Port Rashid in Dubai on 15 March 2020, and the crew has been isolated and placed under lockdown.

In June 2020, as a result of the ongoing COVID-19 pandemic, Pullmantur Cruises filed for financial reorganization under Spain's insolvency laws. The following month, Royal Caribbean International's CEO Richard Fain stated that Horizon, along with the other ships in Pullmantur's fleet, had been or will be sold. Since 18 August 2020, the ship was laid up in Elefsis Bay, Greece.

On 25 August 2022, the ship left Eleusis towed by the tugs Vernicos Sifnos and Christos XL towards Aliaga for scrapping.

Gallery

See also
 List of cruise ships

References

External links
 
 Horizon at CDF Croisières de France
 
 Professional photographs from shipspotting.com

1989 ships
Ships built in Papenburg
Ships of Celebrity Cruises
Ships of Royal Caribbean International
Ships of Croisières de France Cruises